Earl of Halifax is a title that has been created four times in British history—once in the Peerage of England, twice in the Peerage of Great Britain, and once in the Peerage of the United Kingdom. The name of the peerage refers to Halifax, West Yorkshire.

The first and fourth creations were elevations for the holders of the first and second creations of the title Viscount Halifax.  The holder of the first creation was later granted the title Marquess of Halifax. The second and third creations were for closely related male members of the Montagu family, landed gentry since the Norman Conquest, and spanned most of the years 1689–1771.

The fourth creation was in 1944 for Lord Halifax, the former viceroy of India (who was the 3rd Viscount Halifax before his elevation to the earldom). He was a prominent 1930s minister, to whom the office of prime minister was offered on the resignation of Chamberlain, which he declined in favour of Churchill.

History of the title

1679 creation
The first creation, in the Peerage of England in 1679, was for George Savile, 1st Viscount Halifax. He had already been made Baron Savile of Elland and Viscount Halifax in 1668, and was later made Marquess of Halifax (this creation of the earldom became extinct in 1700; see Marquess of Halifax for more information).

1714 and 1715 creations
The title was recreated in 1714 for Charles Montagu, 1st Baron Halifax, First Lord of the Treasury to George I, along with the courtesy title of Viscount Sunbury. Both titles were created with remainder to heirs male. A member of the prominent Montagu family, he was the son of George Montagu, younger son of Henry Montagu, 1st Earl of Manchester (see the Duke of Manchester). Montagu had already been created Baron Halifax, of Halifax in the County of York, in 1700, with remainder, failing heirs male of his own, to his nephew George, son and heir of his brother Edward Montagu.

On Lord Halifax's death in 1715 the viscountcy and earldom became extinct. He was succeeded in the barony according to the special remainder by his nephew George Montagu. Less than a month after his uncle's death, both titles were revived in his favour, making him Earl of Halifax and Viscount Sunbury. He was succeeded by his son, the second Earl, who was a prominent statesman. However, on his death in 1771 all the titles became extinct.

1944 creation
The title was created for a fourth time in the Peerage of the United Kingdom in 1944 for Edward Wood, 3rd Viscount Halifax, the former Foreign Secretary and former Viceroy of India. The Wood family descends from Francis Wood, of Barnsley. His second son, Francis Wood, was created a baronet, of Barnsley in the County of York, in 1784, with remainder to his elder brother, the Reverend Henry Wood, and failing him to the sons of his younger brother, Charles Wood (who had died two years earlier). He was succeeded according to the special remainder by his nephew, the second Baronet (the son of Charles Wood).

His son, the third Baronet, was a prominent Liberal politician and served as Chancellor of the Exchequer from 1846 to 1852, during which he became notorious for the policies he followed during the Great Famine in Ireland. In 1866 he was created Viscount Halifax, of Monk Bretton in the West Riding of the County of York, in the Peerage of the United Kingdom. His aforementioned grandson, the third Viscount, was also a noted politician. In 1925, nine years before he succeeded his father, he was himself raised to the Peerage of the United Kingdom as Baron Irwin, of Kirby Underdale in the County of York. In 1944 he was further honoured when he was made Earl of Halifax.  the titles are held by his grandson, the third Earl, who succeeded his father in 1980.

Another member of the Wood family was the Conservative politician Richard Wood, Baron Holderness. He was the second son of the first Earl of Halifax.

The family seat is Garrowby Hall, near Garrowby in the East Riding of Yorkshire.

Earl of Halifax, first creation

Viscount Halifax, first creation (1668)
George Savile, 1st Viscount Halifax (1633–1695) (created Earl of Halifax in 1679)

Earl of Halifax (1679)
George Savile, 1st Earl of Halifax (1633–1695) (created Marquess of Halifax in 1682)

Marquess of Halifax (1682)

George Savile, 1st Marquess of Halifax (1633–1695)
William Savile, 2nd Marquess of Halifax (1665–1700)

Earl of Halifax, second and third creations

Baron Halifax (1700)
Charles Montagu, 1st Baron Halifax (1661–1715) (created Earl of Halifax in 1714)

Earl of Halifax (1714)
Charles Montagu, 1st Earl of Halifax (1661–1715)

Baron Halifax (1700; reverted)
George Montagu, 2nd Baron Halifax (1685–1739) (created Earl of Halifax in 1715)

Earl of Halifax (1715)
George Montagu, 1st Earl of Halifax (1685–1739)
George Montagu-Dunk, 2nd Earl of Halifax (1716–1771)

Male-line family tree

Earl of Halifax, fourth creation

Wood baronets, of Barnsley (1784)
Sir Francis Wood, 1st Baronet (1729–1795)
Sir Francis Lindley Wood, 2nd Baronet (1771–1846)
Sir Charles Wood, 3rd Baronet (1800–1885) (created Viscount Halifax in 1866)

Viscount Halifax, second creation (1866)
Charles Wood, 1st Viscount Halifax (1800–1885)
Charles Lindley Wood, 2nd Viscount Halifax (1839–1934)
Edward Frederick Lindley Wood, 3rd Viscount Halifax (1881–1959) (created Baron Irwin in 1925 and Earl of Halifax in 1944)

Earl of Halifax (1944)
Edward Frederick Lindley Wood, 1st Earl of Halifax (1881–1959)
Charles Ingram Courtenay Wood, 2nd Earl of Halifax (1912–1980)
(Charles Edward) Peter Neil Wood, 3rd Earl of Halifax (born 1944)

The heir apparent is the present holder's only son, James Charles Wood, Lord Irwin (born 1977).
The heir apparent's heir apparent is his only son, Hon. Rex Patrick Wood (born 2010).

Male-line family tree

Line of succession

Only the first three in the line of succession are in remainder to the earldom and its subsidiary titles.  All in the line of succession are in remainder to the earlier created viscountcy and its subsidiary titles.

  Charles Wood, 1st Viscount Halifax (1800–1885)
  Charles Lindley Wood, 2nd Viscount Halifax (1839–1934)
  Edward Frederick Lindley Wood, 1st Earl of Halifax (1881–1959)
  Charles Ingram Courtenay Wood, 2nd Earl of Halifax (1912–1980)
  (Charles Edward) Peter Neil Wood, 3rd Earl of Halifax (born 1944)
 (1) James Charles Wood, Lord Irwin (born 1977)
 (2) Hon. Rex Patrick Wood (born 2010)
  Richard Frederick Wood, Baron Holderness (1920–2002)
 (3) Hon. Edward Orlando Charles Wood (born 1951)
 Hon. Frederick George Lindley Meynell (1846–1910)
 Col. Francis Hugo Lindley Meynell (1880–1941)
 Col. Hugo Meynell (1909–1960)
 Nicholas Edward Hugo Meynell (1937–1988)
 (4) Hugo Graham Nicholas Meynell (born 1970)
 (5) Alexander Frederick Miles Meynell (born 1972)
 David Christian Francis Meynell (1940–2001)
 (6) Charles Christian George Meynell (born 1964)
 (7) Cosmo Frederick Charles Meynell (born 1995)
 (8) Felix Meynell
 (9) Hector Edward Hugo Meynell (born 2005)
 Rev. Mark Meynell (1914–2006)
 (10) Christopher Mark Meynell (born 1941)
 (11) Reverend Mark John Henry Meynell (born 1970)
 (12) Guy Francis Meynell (born 1973)
 (13) Reverend Andrew Francis Meynell (born 1943)
 (14) Aidan Jonathan Charles Meynell (born 1974)
 (15) Peter John Meynell (born 1947)
 (16) Marten Charles Meynell (born 1977)
 Capt. Charles Wilfred Lindley Meynell (1890–1976)
 Richard Walter Meynell (1923–2010)
 (17) Anthony Charles Meynell (born 1952)
 (18) Wilfrid Meynell (born 1986)
 (19) Charles Humphrey Meynell (born 1954)

References

Sources

Extinct earldoms in the Peerage of England
Extinct earldoms in the Peerage of Great Britain
Earldoms in the Peerage of the United Kingdom

Wood family
1679 establishments in England
Noble titles created in 1679
Noble titles created in 1714
Noble titles created in 1715
Noble titles created in 1944
Noble titles created for UK MPs